In the Dove Book and Russian folklore, the Indrik-Beast (Russian: Индрик-зверь, transliteration: Indrik zver' ) is a fabulous beast, the king of all animals, who lives on a mountain known as "The Holy Mountain" where no other foot may tread. When it stirs, the Earth trembles. The word "Indrik" is a distorted version of the Russian word edinorog (unicorn). The Indrik is described as a gigantic bull with legs of a deer, the head of a horse and an enormous horn in its snout, making it vaguely similar to a rhinoceros. The Russian folkloric creature gives its name to a synonym of Paraceratherium, Indricotherium, the biggest land mammal ever to live.

See also
Camahueto
Elasmotherium
Unicorn

References
There are no images found

Slavic legendary creatures
Russian mythology
Unicorns